Redmi K20 Pro and Redmi K20 (Xiaomi Mi 9T Pro and Xiaomi Mi 9T globally) are smartphones introduced by the Xiaomi sub-brand Redmi in an event held in China. A Premium variant for the Pro was later revealed, with the Snapdragon 855+, a new 512 GB/12 GB RAM model, a refined cooling system, and an exclusive finish.

Specifications

Design

The Redmi K20 Pro and Redmi K20 ( Xiaomi Mi 9T globally ) are available in four colors: Glacier Blue, Flame Red, Carbon Black and Pearl White. The Redmi K20 Pro and Redmi K20 both have 6.39" full-screen FHD+ Horizon AMOLED displays,103%NTSC,DCI-P3  and a glass/metal construction.

Hardware

The Redmi K20 Pro comes with the Qualcomm Snapdragon 855 paired with 6 GB of RAM with 64 or 128 GB internal storage and 8 GB of RAM with 128 GB or 256 GB of non-expandable internal storage. The Redmi K20 is powered by the mid-range Qualcomm Snapdragon 730 and has the same RAM and storage options as the Redmi K20 Pro. The Redmi K20 Pro has 27W fast charging while the Redmi K20 has 18W fast charging; both have 7th generation in-display fingerprint sensors and 4000 mAh batteries.

Camera

Both smartphones have three rear-facing cameras but K20 Pro has the  48-megapixel Sony Exmor IMX586 as the primary sensor While the K20 has the Sony IMX582, a 13-megapixel ultrawide sensor, and an 8 MP telephoto lens, both with a motorized pop-up 20-megapixel front camera.

Software
Both smartphones come with MIUI 10 on top of Android Pie. The Redmi K20 Pro Premium Edition ships with MIUI 11 on top of Android 10.

References 

K20
Mobile phones introduced in 2019
Mobile phones with multiple rear cameras
Mobile phones with 4K video recording
Discontinued smartphones